Bilge is a Turkish name. It is best known as the epithet of the early Turkic ruler Bilge Kağan. As is the case with many Turkic names, is a unisex name. Even in today's Turkey, Bilge continues to be adopted as both a male and female name.

It may refer to:

Given name
 Bilge Ebiri (born 1973), Turkish-American journalist and filmmaker
 Bilge Kağan, Göktürk ruler
 Kutlug I Bilge Kagan, founder of Uyghur Khaganate
 Bilge Kösebalaban (born 1980), Turkish musician
 Bilge Olgaç (1940–1994), Turkish film director
 Bilge Su Koyun (born 1999), Turkish women's footballer
 Bilge Tarhan (footballer) (1941–2016), Turkish Olympian footballer
 Bilge Tarhan (gymnast) (born 2004), Turkish female artistic gymnast
 Bilge Umar (born 1936), Turkish writer
 Bilge Yildiz, Turkish nuclear engineer
 Nuri Bilge Ceylan (born 1959), Turkish film director
 Bilge Tonyukuk (born 646), Supreme Commander of Second Turkic Khaganate

Surname
 Dilara Bilge, Turkish volleyball player
 Melek Bilge, Turkish basketball player

See also
 Bilgen, Turkish surname

Turkish-language surnames
Turkish unisex given names

br:Bilge
tr:Bilge